Damaneh (also Romanized as Dāmaneh; also known as Davāneh) is a village in Khir Rural District, Runiz District, Estahban County, Fars Province, Iran. At the 2006 census, its population was 479, in 107 families.

References 

Populated places in Estahban County